The District Six Schoolhouse is a historic school building on Elmendorf Road in Shoreham, Vermont.  Built about 1833 and now converted into a residence, this modest stone structure is one of Vermont's oldest surviving district schoolhouses.  It was listed on the National Register of Historic Places in 1977.

Description
The former District Six Schoolhouse stands in a rural area of northeastern Shoreham, on the southwest side of Elmendorf Road.  It is a modest single-story stone structure, measuring just , with a gabled roof.  It is built of course rubble limestone and covered by a standing seam metal roof.  The street-facing facade has two bays, with the entrance in a recess on the left and a sash window on the right, and has a half-round window in the gable.  The southeast roof face has a gabled wood-frame dormer, part of alterations made to convert the building to residential use.  A single-story wood-frame ell extends to the rear.

The school was built in 1833 out of locally quarried limestone, and is a good example of late Federal period vernacular architecture.  It is one of a number of surviving stone district schools in the region.  It remained in use as a schoolhouse until the 1940s.  After standing vacant for some years, it was rehabilitated and converted into a residence.

See also
National Register of Historic Places listings in Addison County, Vermont

References

School buildings on the National Register of Historic Places in Vermont
National Register of Historic Places in Addison County, Vermont
Federal architecture in Vermont
School buildings completed in 1833
Buildings and structures in Shoreham, Vermont